Icacos may refer to:

Icacos Point, Trinidad and Tobago
Cayo Icacos, a small, uninhabited island off the coast of Fajardo, Puerto Rico